Cladodiopsis is a genus of stalk-eyed flies in the family Diopsidae.

Species
C. leptophylla Séguy, 1949
C. seyrigi Séguy, 1949
C. sicardi Séguy, 1949

References

Diopsidae
Diptera of Africa
Diopsoidea genera